Andrew Kimbrell (born August 26, 1950) is an American public interest attorney and author, as well as an advocate for sustainable agriculture and against industrial agriculture. He is the founder and executive director of the Center for Food Safety and the International Center for Technology Assessment. He is also the co-founder of Foundation Earth and the president of the Board of Humane Farm Animal Care. He previously served as Policy Director at the Foundation for Economic Trends for eight years. In 1994, he was named one of the 100 leading visionaries in the world by the Utne Reader, and in 2008, he was named one of the "50 people who could save the planet" by the Guardian.

References

21st-century American lawyers
20th-century American lawyers
1950 births
Living people
20th-century American writers
21st-century American writers